= Project Rousseau =

- Formation: 2011
- Founder: Andrew Heinrich
- Type: Nonprofit organization
- Headquarters: New York City, United States
- Website: projectrousseau.org

Project Rousseau is a nonprofit organization based in New York City, primarily focused on assisting underserved youth and migrants. It was founded in 2011.

== History ==
In 2023, Project Rousseau was reported to be helping Venezuelan asylum seekers in New York City obtain work authorization while providing them legal representation in immigration cases. It also distributed winter coats to migrants.

The organization has partnered with various groups to aid asylum seekers at Ellis Island, offering legal and logistical support.

During the Trump administration, Project Rousseau actively supported migrant communities affected by stricter immigration policies.
